

The Bellanger-Denhaut 22 (sometimes known by the military designation Bellanger-Denhaut HB.3) was a twin-engined bomber/reconnaissance flying boat designed by François Denhaut the technical director for seaplanes for the car manufacturer Bellanger.

Design and development
The B-D 22 was an unequal span biplane powered by two  Hispano-Suiza 8Fd  inline piston engines. It had an open cockpit forward of the wings for the pilot and co-pilot to sit side-by-side and gunner's positions midships and at the bow and the wings could be folded for stowage. The French Naval aviation ordered five and designated them as the HB.3 although they appear to have been little used. A commercial transport version was developed with the gunner's positions removed and a cabin for six passengers installed behind the pilot's cockpit.

Operators

French Navy five as the HB.3

Specifications (B-D 22)

See also

References

Bellanger aircraft
1920s French bomber aircraft
Flying boats
Biplanes
Twin piston-engined tractor aircraft